Pittosporum eugenioides, common names lemonwood or tarata, is a species of New Zealand native evergreen tree. Its leaves are mottled yellow-green with curly edges and a salient bright midrib, and have a strong lemony smell when crushed. It has highly fragrant clusters of attractive yellow-cream flowers in spring, followed by distinctive black seed capsules. It is New Zealand's largest Pittosporum.

The binomial qualifier eugenioides means "resembling Eugenia", a different genus of plants.

The variegated cultivar 'Variegatum' has gained the Royal Horticultural Society's Award of Garden Merit.

Life cycle/phenology
Pittosporum eugenioides starts out as a small compact tree, as it matures it becomes a tall branched tree. The lemonwood flowers between October and December. The following year after flowering the capsules will open. The capsules open the next year because the fruit of the lemonwood takes between 12 and 14 months to ripen. There is unripe fruit and ripe fruit present on the lemonwood at the same time, this is the current season’s fruit and last season’s fruit. Lemonwood is pollinated by both insects and birds, the seeds are bird dispersed. The seeds of the lemonwood germinate quickly and will become seedlings within a month.

Range
Pittosporum euegnioides is endemic to New Zealand. There are “about 200 trees and shrubs” in the genus located in neighbouring parts of the world. Countries with the same genus found include; Africa, Australia, some Pacific islands, southern & eastern Asia, and New Zealand.  
A reason for this endemic occurrence is due to the isolation of New Zealand over a long period of time.

New Zealand range
Pittosporum euginiodes is found throughout New Zealand’s South Island and North Island in low lying forests. It is found in forest clearings and along forest margins up to 600m above sea level.

Habitat preferences
Pittosporum euegnioides can be found in a cooler, mature, lowland and subalpine forest climate zone throughout New Zealand. The species can be found in regenerating areas of forest, both young and old. It has proved to be a great plant for establishing a quick canopy.

This species, along with other Pittosporum are making their way in to the average house hold gardens. Nurseries and Garden Centres are stocking this native because it is suited to New Zealand conditions where it naturally grew many years ago.
  
At home in the garden, P. euegnioides prefers a sunny to part shade position, does not mind the wind, and thrives in soil with good drainage.

Cultivation
The viability of the lemonwood's seeds is affected by moisture levels of the soil. If the moisture levels are too high the seed is likely to become unviable.  The lemonwood like other pittosporums is somewhat drought resistant  therefore rainfall is not a major factor in the lemonwoods survival. P. eugenioides is relatively simple to look after from season at home. It grows well, thriving off regular watering intervals during Summer. It enjoys a feed with general tree and shrub fertiliser twice a year during Spring and Summer while it is growing. Responds well to pruning also, which will assure survival in the forest too if disturbed.

Ecology
The pittosporum flower weevil (Aneuma rubricale) is a parasite that feeds on the underside of the lemonwood leaves. This parasite does not kill the lemonwood it just damages the leaves through its feeding. The holes the weevils eat in the leaves are visible because the leaf reacts causing a dark brownie purple ring to form around the hole. Pittosporum eugenioides is only a host to the adult weevil as the larvae are hosted on different pittosporums. Common garden pests can cover this plant, such as Aphids and blister scale (Psyilids). Both can easily be controlled and treated with an insecticide. The best time to spray as a preventative is February, then again in October.

Citrus aroma
The sweet scent of the flowers suggest nectar loving birds find this an ideal plant to forage from. The experiment was carried out to see if the citrus-like chemicals were the same ones that are present in lemon-like species, such as Verbena varieties. The lemony leaves are a unique combination of scented chemicals found in the oil produced. Octyl acetate, Terpinen-4-ol and Decanol were found in a test that was carried out. Octyl acetate is responsible for the "fruity, Jasmine, herbaceous aroma". Terpinen-4-ol scent is "somewhere between peppermint and pine". Finally, Decanol is a "fatty, orange blossom odor". Results of this test unearthed that this lemonwood aroma combination is very unusual for this genus and the chemicals are different to what you would find in other citrus scented species.

Traditional uses

Cultural uses
Maori traditionally used the gum and crushed leaves and flowers of the tarata for scent, usually mixed with plant oils such as titoki and kohia.
Maori also used the lemonwood to make hair oils and perfume. For perfume, the oil was mixed with bird fat. The gum from the tree was used for bad breath. They rolled the gum in to a ball and this was thought to last a whole generation. The gum made a great glue when chewed as well.

Restoration planting
Pittosporum eugenioides is great for establishing a shade canopy in a restoration setting. It then provides an opportunity to introduce understory, shade loving plants to the same location, later planting underneath the lemonwood trees. It is recommended to plant this species closer than you would normally find in the established forest. “close planting imitates the growth of the seedlings on the forest floor”, resulting in plants tending to grow upward more rapidly. P. eugenioides is one of the best plants for this rapid canopy growth because it is already fast growing.    
Lemonwood is on the recommended list for replanting “small trees up to 6m” naturally occurring species in to the design guidelines of the Christchurch City Council. “Hardy native species offer a great number of benefits” and are more flexible to suit local conditions compared to “foreign” plant selection.

Home garden design
It is important to include historic, naturally occurring species planting design because they perform well in local conditions. “As well as looking good, the design provides wildlife habitat, recreational spaces, also assisting in filtering water runoff”.   
P. eugenioides in a home setting will most likely be found as a hedging or screening plant. Happy to be near a swimming pool, a great choice too because it has minimal leaf litter drop. Great in a windy position in a design and also provides a barrier for the surrounding more intolerant plants. Great as a greenery backdrop with the textural leaves clustered together as well.

References

eugenioides
Trees of New Zealand
Trees of mild maritime climate